Orfelia is a cosmopolitan genus of flies in the family Keroplatidae.

Species
Orfelia affinis (Brunetti, 1912)
Orfelia amurensis Zaitzev, 1994
Orfelia angulata (Sasakawa, 1994)
Orfelia angustata (Van Duzee, 1928)
Orfelia apicipennis (Brunetti, 1912)
Orfelia baishanzuensis Cao & Xu, 2008
Orfelia bezzii (Winnertz, 1863)
Orfelia bicolor Lane, 1961
Orfelia boreoalpina Salmela, 2017
Orfelia colei Evenhuis, 2006
Orfelia discoloria (Meigen, 1818)
Orfelia divaricata (Loew, 1870)
Orfelia equalis (Van Duzee, 1928)
Orfelia excelsa Chandler, 1994
Orfelia falcata Zaitzev, 1994
Orfelia fasciata (Meigen, 1804)
Orfelia fascipennis (Say, 1824)
Orfelia flaviventris (Brunetti, 1912)
Orfelia fultoni (Fisher, 1940)
Orfelia funerea (Brunetti, 1912)
Orfelia georgica Kurina & Jürgenstein, 2013
Orfelia gruevi Bechev, 2002
Orfelia helvola Cao & Xu, 2008
Orfelia krivosheinae Zaitzev, 1994
Orfelia limbata Zaitzev, 1994
Orfelia matilei Zaitzev, 1994
Orfelia minima (Giglio-Tos, 1890)
Orfelia mitchellensis (Shaw, 1941)
Orfelia negotiosa Sivec & Plassmann, 1982
Orfelia nemoralis (Meigen, 1818)
Orfelia nigribarba (Van Duzee, 1928)
Orfelia nigricornis (Fabricius, 1805)
Orfelia notabilis (Williston, 1893)
Orfelia ochracea (Meigen, 1818)
Orfelia pallida (Staeger, 1840)
Orfelia persimilis Caspers, 1991
Orfelia rossica Evenhuis, 2006
Orfelia sachalinensis Evenhuis, 2006
Orfelia saeva Sivec & Plassmann, 1982
Orfelia sagax (Johannsen, 1910)
Orfelia subdiscoloria (Matile, 1969)
Orfelia subnigricornis Zaitzev & Menzel, 1996
Orfelia trifida Kurina & Jürgenstein, 2013
Orfelia tristis (Lundström, 1911)
Orfelia ussuriensis Zaitzev & Menzel, 1996

References

External links

 Fungus gnats online

Keroplatidae
Sciaroidea genera
Taxa named by Oronzio Gabriele Costa